Marcin Piekarski (born 21 September 1983 in Gorzów Wielkopolski) is a Polish luger who has competed since 1998. He finished 17th in the men's doubles event at the 2006 Winter Olympics in Turin.

Piekarski's best finish at the FIL World Luge Championships was 19th in the men's doubles event twice (2005, 2008).

References
2006 luge men's doubles results
FIL-Luge profile

External links
 
 
 

1983 births
Living people
Polish male lugers
Olympic lugers of Poland
Lugers at the 2006 Winter Olympics
Sportspeople from Gorzów Wielkopolski